Chimarra abyssinica is a species of fingernet caddisfly in the family Philopotamidae.

References 

Insects described in 1913
Trichoptera